Adelaide Clemens (born 30 November 1989) is an Australian actress. She was nominated for a Logie Award in 2008 for her role in the television series Love My Way. In 2012, she played Valentine Wannop in BBC's television miniseries adaptation Parade's End. In Hollywood, Clemens has appeared in X-Men Origins: Wolverine and The Great Gatsby, and starred in Silent Hill: Revelation 3D (as Heather Mason). From 2013 to 2016, she starred in the television series Rectify.

Early life
Clemens was born in Brisbane, Queensland. Her parents lived in Japan but went to Australia for her birth. She has two younger brothers Sebastian and Felix. Her father, Mark Clemens, is English and was a marketing manager for Seagram. Her mother, Janea Clemens, is an Australian cardiac nurse. After living in Japan, she was raised in France until the age of 6 and then Hong Kong to the age of 12, where she attended the Hong Kong International School. When she was 12 years old, her family moved to Australia to live in Sydney, New South Wales. She attended high school at the Queenwood School for Girls, in the Sydney suburb of Balmoral.

At the age of 19, Clemens moved to the United States. She at first lived in Los Angeles, California, but has lived in New York City since 2015.

Career
Clemens began working as an actress in Australian television while in high school. She guest-starred in a 2006 episode of Blue Water High as Juliet, and, in 2007, starred in the children's series Pirate Islands: The Lost Treasure of Fiji, as Alison. Clemens played Harper in the Showtime drama Love My Way that year, and was nominated for the Graham Kennedy Award for Most Outstanding New Talent at the 2008 Logie Awards for the role.

Clemens was seen in the MTV Networks Australia dramatic film, Dream Life (2008), and had small roles in the television series All Saints and the film X-Men Origins: Wolverine, in 2009. She became the face of Jan Logan Jewellery that year. Clemens relocated to Los Angeles, California, in 2009.

She starred in the film Wasted on the Young (2010) as Xandrie. Written and directed by Ben C. Lucas, the film tells the story of a high school love triangle that leads to a party ending in gun violence.

She guest-starred on the Fox crime drama, Lie To Me, and starred as a sociopathic prostitute in the film Generation Um... (2010).

, Clemens was in negotiations to join the cast of Fury Road, the fourth in the Mad Max film series by George Miller. The following year, she starred in the film Certainty (2011), directed by Peter Askin. She also starred in Vampire (2011) as Ladybird, a suicidal single mother. The film was the English-language feature debut of noted Japanese director Shunji Iwai.

The next year, Clemens starred in Camilla Dickinson (2012), an adaptation of Madeleine L'Engle's 1951 novel. She starred as teenager Heather Mason in the horror film Silent Hill: Revelation 3D (2012). Also that year, Clemens played a lead role as the young suffragette Valentine Wannop in Parade's End (2012), a television mini-series adaptation of the Ford Madox Ford tetralogy co-produced by HBO and BBC Two. She also appeared in the horror film No One Lives (2012).

The following year, she appeared in The Great Gatsby (2013), based on F. Scott Fitzgerald's novel of the same name, playing Catherine, the sister of Myrtle Wilson. On television, Clemens began starring as Tawney Talbot in the 2013 Sundance Channel series, Rectify. In 2020, Clemens took a starring role in the CBS drama Tommy.

Filmography

Film

Television

References

External links 

 
 

1989 births
Actresses from Brisbane
Australian film actresses
Australian people of English descent
Australian television actresses
Living people
21st-century Australian actresses